The 2013 Power Horse Cup was a men's tennis tournament played on clay courts. It was the first edition of the Power Horse Cup as an ATP World Tour 250 series event on the 2013 ATP World Tour and replaced the World Team Cup, a team event previously held at the same venue. It took place at the Rochusclub in Düsseldorf, Germany, from May 19 through May 25, 2013.

Singles main draw entrants

Seeds 

 Rankings are as of May 13, 2013.

Other entrants 
The following players received wildcards into the singles main draw:
  Benjamin Becker
  Tommy Haas
  Juan Mónaco

The following players received entry from the qualifying draw:
  André Ghem
  Evgeny Korolev
  Łukasz Kubot
  Guido Pella

The following player received entry as a lucky loser:
  Aljaž Bedene

Withdrawals 
Before the tournament
  Nicolás Almagro
  Grigor Dimitrov
  Florian Mayer
  Philipp Petzschner
  Dmitry Tursunov (left hamstring injury)
  Mikhail Youzhny
During the tournament
  Tommy Haas (illness)

Doubles main draw entrants

Seeds 

 Rankings are as of May 13, 2013.

Other entrants 
The following pairs received wildcards into the doubles main draw:
  Richard Becker /  Dominik Schulz
  Dustin Brown /  Frank Moser

Champions

Singles 

 Juan Mónaco def.  Jarkko Nieminen, 6–4, 6–3

Doubles 

 Andre Begemann /  Martin Emmrich def.  Treat Conrad Huey /  Dominic Inglot, 7–5, 6–2

References

External links 
 

Power Horse Cup
Düsseldorf Open (ATP Tour)
2013 in German tennis
2010s in Düsseldorf